Dušan Kljajić (born 12 October 1963) is a Serbian football manager and former player.

Career
After coming through the youth system at Red Star Belgrade, Kljajić played for Yugoslav Second League clubs Galenika Zemun, Maribor and OFK Kikinda, before joining OFK Beograd during the 1985–86 Yugoslav First League winter break. He later spent three seasons with Yugoslav First League side Rijeka from 1988 to 1991.

After hanging up his boots, Kljajić served as manager of several Serbian First League clubs, including Bežanija (two spells), Novi Pazar (January–March 2010), Donji Srem, Sinđelić Beograd, Budućnost Dobanovci and Radnički Sremska Mitrovica.

Personal life
Kljajić is the father of former Partizan goalkeeper Filip Kljajić.

References

External links
 
 

1963 births
Living people
Footballers from Belgrade
Yugoslav footballers
Serbia and Montenegro footballers
Serbian footballers
Association football defenders
FK Zemun players
NK Maribor players
OFK Kikinda players
OFK Beograd players
FK Rudar Prijedor players
HNK Rijeka players
Samsunspor footballers
FK Obilić players
FK Smederevo players
Yugoslav Second League players
Yugoslav First League players
Süper Lig players
Second League of Serbia and Montenegro players
First League of Serbia and Montenegro players
Yugoslav expatriate footballers
Expatriate footballers in Turkey
Yugoslav expatriate sportspeople in Turkey
Serbian football managers
FK Bežanija managers
FK Novi Pazar managers
FK Donji Srem managers
Serbian expatriate football managers
Expatriate football managers in Thailand
Serbian expatriate sportspeople in Thailand